A deployable structure is a structure that can change shape so as to significantly change its size.

Examples of deployable structures are umbrellas, some tensegrity structures, bistable structures, some Origami shapes and scissor-like structures. Deployable structures are also used on spacecraft for deploying solar panels and solar sails.

Space-based deployable structures can be categorized into three primary classes: the first is the articulated structure class wherein rigid members contain sliding contact joints or are folded at hinge points and pivot to deploy, often locking into place.  The second class consists of on-orbit assembly where a device is fabricated and/or mechanically joined in space to form the structure.  The final class is high strain structures (often composed of High strain composites) wherein the device is dramatically flexed from one configuration to another during deployment.

Gallery

See also
 Engineering mechanics
 Four-bar linkage
 Kinematics
 Linkage (mechanical)
 Machine
 Outline of machines
 Overconstrained mechanism
 Parallel motion
 Slider-crank linkage
 Compliant mechanism

References

External links

University of Cambridge Deployable structures department publications

Linkages (mechanical)
Structural engineering